Tomoko Masuzawa is Professor Emerita of Comparative Literature and History at the University of Michigan. In 1979, she received her MA in religious studies at Yale University. Masuzawa received her PhD in Religious Studies from University of California Santa Barbara in 1985. European intellectual history (19th century), discourses on religion, history of religion, and psychoanalysis are Masuzawa’s fields of study.

Bibliography 
 In Search of Dreamtime: The Quest for the Origin of Religion (1993)
 "Culture" in Mark C. Taylor (ed.), Critical Terms for Religious Studies (1998)
 "Origin" in Willi Braun and Russell T. McCutcheon (eds.), Guide to the Study of Religion (1999)
 "From Empire to Utopia: Effacement of Colonial Markings in Lost Horizon" in Positions: East Asia Cultural Critique (1999)
 The Invention of World Religions or, How European Universalism was Preserved in the Language of Pluralism (2005)

References

Works cited

External links 
 Masuzawa Guggenheim Fellowship 2010
 The University of Alabama - Department of Religious Studies
 Profile at the University of Michigan

University of Michigan faculty
American philosophers
American academics of Japanese descent
Year of birth missing (living people)
Living people
American religion academics